Drop Dead Weird is an Australian-Irish children's comedy drama television series screening on the Seven Network's digital channel 7TWO from 6 November 2017. This Australian/Irish co-production was created by Sally Browning and Dean Cropp. It was written by Stephen Abbott, Warren Coleman and Tadhg Mac Dhonnagain and directed by Beth Armstrong, Danny Raco and Glenn Fraser. The series was also broadcast on CITV in the United Kingdom from June 2019.

Synopsis
The Champs are an Australian family who move to Tubbershandy, an isolated seaside village in western Ireland to save the Bed & Breakfast run by their Irish grandfather. The three Aussie children Lulu, Bruce and Frankie are finding it hard to fit into a new hometown but also hide the secret that their parents recently became zombies. The kids must keep the truth under wraps from the community and in particular, local identity Bernadette (Bunni) Shanahan.

Cast
 Sofia Nolan as Lulu
 Jack Riley as Bruce
 Adele Cosentino as Frances (Frankie) 
 Amanda Bishop as Mum
 David Collins as Dad
 Maeliosa Stafford as Grandad
 Pauline McLynn as Bunni 
 Lucy Maher as Aisling
 David Rawle as Dermot
 Connor Burke as Connor

Series overview

External links

References

7two original programming
Australian children's television series
Australian comedy-drama television series
2017 Australian television series debuts
English-language television shows
Irish children's television shows
2017 Irish television series debuts
Zombies in television